Diamantino is a 2018 fantasy comedy-drama film written and directed by Gabriel Abrantes and Daniel Schmidt. The film was produced by Justin Taurand, Maria João Mayer, and Daniel van Hoogstraten. It stars Carloto Cotta, Cleo Tavares, Anabela Moreira, and Margarida Moreira. The film follows Premiere association football star Diamantino after he loses his special touch and ends his career in disgrace. Searching for a new purpose, the international icon sets on a delirious odyssey where he confronts neo-fascism, the refugee crisis, genetic modification and the hunt for the source of genius. It was screened in the International Critics' Week section at the 2018 Cannes Film Festival, where it won the Grand Prize.

Plot
Diamantino is a world-famous Portuguese soccer star whose looks and persona bear an uncanny resemblance to that of real-life soccer star Cristiano Ronaldo. Diamantino was raised by a single father and has a pair of twin older sisters who verbally abuse and manipulate him so they can take advantage of his wealth. Diamantino is rich, beautiful, and a genius on the field but lacks almost any intelligence off the field. The one thing he does have is an abundance of empathy. So much so that after he rescues a boat full of refugees while on his yacht, he gets extremely affected by their tragedy and it causes him to miss the goal winning shot in the FIFA World Cup championship game. At the same time, Diamantino's father dies from a stroke after being harassed by his twin daughters.

After being blamed for losing the World Cup for Portugal, Diamantino's career is over and he becomes a national joke. While wallowing in sorrow over his career and his father's death, Diamantino sees an ad for child refugees who need a family. He goes on a TV interview to express his desire to adopt a refugee. Two lesbian Secret Service agents who have been investigating Diamantino for money laundering, see the interview and decide to capitalize on the opportunity. One of the agents named Aisha disguises herself as a boy named Rahim and poses as Diamantino's adopted refugee. Meanwhile, his sisters volunteer their brother to the ministry of propaganda whose plan is to clone Diamantino and create an entire soccer team of genius players. Diamantino, being a gullible and obedient little brother, doesn't suspect anything and goes to his appointments every day with genetic specialist Dr. Lamborghini thinking they are trying to get his mojo back. Diamantino's cloning treatment involves a large amount of hormones and he begins to grow boobs.

Agent Aisha's undercover investigation reveals that Diamantino is innocent and it is his sisters who are stealing from him and laundering the money. During Aisha's investigation, she and Diamantino begin to get close and her lesbian partner accuses Aisha of being too emotionally invested in the case. Diamantino's sisters see security camera footage of their fight and realize who Aisha is and what she's doing. The sisters attempt to kill Aisha but are interrupted when they see Diamantino arriving home. Aisha escapes and goes to Diamantino who takes her to the safety of his yacht. On the yacht, Aisha and Diamantino have a romantic moment and she reveals to him that she is a woman. The next morning, Diamantino's sisters text him the video of Aisha and her girlfriend arguing and trick him into believing it was them who stole the money from him. Diamantino then goes to meet with his sisters who then kidnap him and bring him to the cloning facility. The last phase of the cloning is to transfer his genius to the clones, and it would kill Diamantino. However, the last phase fails because Diamantino is too dumb and doesn't have enough active brainpower to transfer. Meanwhile, Aisha breaks into the facility to rescue Diamantino but runs into the twins who try to kill her. Aisha ends up killing both the twins and tries to rescue Diamantino who realizes her feelings for him were true. Just as Aisha is about to get Diamantino to safety, she is shot by the director of the ministry of propaganda who then proceeds to try and drown her. Diamantino musters all of his strength and kills the director, saving Aisha. Diamantino realizes he got his mojo back, but decides to give up soccer, and he and Aisha live a happy life together.

Cast

 Carloto Cotta as Diamantino Matamouros
 Cleo Tavares as Aisha Brito
 Anabela Moreira as Sonia Matamouros
 Margarida Moreira as Natasha Matamouros
 Carla Maciel as Dr. Lamborghini
 Chico Chapas as Chico Matamouros
 Hugo Santos Silva as Mouro
 Joana Barrios as Minister Ferro
 Filipe Vargas as Helena Guerra
 Maria Leite as Lucia
 Manuela Moura Guedes as Gisele
 Leandro Vieira as Goalkeeper

Production 
The film was produced by Maria & Mayer production company in association with Les Films du Bèlier and Syndrome Films. The producers were Justin Taurand, Maria João Mayer, and Daniel van Hoogstraten. The film was shot in Portugal, France, and Brazil through their respective production companies.

Release 
In the worldwide box office, the film grossed a total of $235,041, 70.2% of which came from international box office and 29.8% from the US domestic box office. The film was distributed in the United States by Kino Lorber. It was released in 1 theater on its opening and made $6,412. The film made a total of $70,088. The film was distributed in France by Ufo Distribution. It was released in 38 theaters and made a total of $88,310. The film was distributed in Italy by I Wonder PIctures. It was released in 51 theaters and made a total of $9,386. The film was distributed in Portugal by Zon Lusomundo Audiovisuais. It was released in 22 theaters and made a total of $65,087. The film was distributed in the United Kingdom by Modern Film Distributors. It was released in 3 theaters and made a total of $2,170.

Reception
The website's critics consensus reads, "Diamantino casts a singularly surreal eye on an ambitious array of subjects, emerging with a cinematic experience as inscrutable as it is unforgettable." On Metacritic, the film has a weighted average score of 73 out of 100, based on 13 critics, indicating "generally favorable reviews". The film won multiple awards including the Critics' Week Grand Prize at the Cannes Film Festival in France. 
In a review for the Los Angeles Times, film critic Justin Chang writes, that the film, "is the funniest gender-bending, human-cloning refugee-crisis soccer comedy I've ever seen, and also the most thoughtful." He goes on to talk about the film's critical reception as well as its depiction of politics saying that, "it was widely received as a welcome blast of escapism, a departure from the worthy, solemn art cinema that proliferates at international film festivals. But its madcap delirium can't hide its insistent politics, its disdain for sham populism and its compassion for the disenfranchised. "Diamantino" is no less committed to these ideas than it is to its own uneven, unforgettable lunacy."

In a Critic's Pick article for The New York Times  written by Glenn Kenny, he writes that the film, "feels like an early Adam Sandler comedy remixed by Pier Paolo Pasolini."

In an article written for Cinemascope, author Josh Cabrita praises Daniel Schmidt and Gabriel Abrantes' directing abilities saying, "Abrantes and Schmidt broach issues such as the refugee crisis, neo-fascism, and surveillance technology with a camp concoction that effortlessly flattens this tapestry of topicalities."

The Guardian gave Diamantino three out of five stars saying that, "The film is fun, but, for all its inventiveness, it's a bit tame, with its nice-but-dim hero. But Diamantino is never dull."

The film was also given three out of four stars by film critic Peter Sobczynski on Roger Ebert's film review website, rogerebert.com. Sobczynski writes that, "the sheer weirdness of the whole enterprise has a charm to it and it certainly is never boring. Bewildering, maybe, but never boring." He goes on to write, "The stuff involving the mad scientist and the unexpected results of her experiments on Diamantino are absurd enough but enter the proceedings in such an arbitrary manner that it fails to land the impact that it might have had with a more focused screenplay."

Awards

References

External links
 
 Diamantino at Box Office Mojo

2018 films
2018 comedy-drama films
2018 LGBT-related films
2018 science fiction films
2010s fantasy comedy-drama films
2010s Portuguese-language films
2010s science fiction comedy-drama films
Brazilian association football films
Brazilian fantasy comedy-drama films
Brazilian LGBT-related films
Brazilian science fiction comedy-drama films
Films about refugees
French association football films
French fantasy comedy-drama films
French LGBT-related films
French science fiction comedy-drama films
Lesbian-related films
LGBT-related science fiction comedy-drama films
Portuguese comedy-drama films
Portuguese fantasy films
Portuguese LGBT-related films
Portuguese science fiction films
Science fantasy films
2010s French films